Saad Hassar ( – born 21 February 1953, Salé) is a Moroccan politician. Between 2007 and 2012, he was Secretary of State for the Interior in the cabinet of Abbas El Fassi, succeeding Fouad Ali El Himma.

Saad Hassar studied at the Mission laïque française of Rabat (Lycée Descartes) and at the École Spéciale des Travaux Publics of Paris. He is a nephew of Abdelkrim al-Khatib, co-founder of the National Popular Movement which later became the Justice and Development Party, and cousin of Moroccan Gendarmerie General Hosni Benslimane.

See also
Cabinet of Morocco

References

Government ministers of Morocco
1953 births
Moroccan engineers
Living people
People from Salé
Alumni of Lycée Descartes (Rabat)
Paul Sabatier University alumni